The Tiaras were a Canadian soul group from Toronto, Ontario, comprising Brenda Russell, Jackie Richardson, Colina Phillips, and Arlene Trotman. Formed in the mid-1960s by composer, producer and musician Al Rain. Rain founded the group as well as wrote their singles as also he wrote for Grant Smith & The Power, The Allen Sisters and Pat Hervey and most notably the theme song "Travellin' Man" the Canadian sensation "The Tommy Hunter Show". the group released two 7" singles, "Where Does All the Time Go" b/w "All I Ever Need Is You" and "Foolish Girl" b/w "Surprise". The Tiaras also provided backing vocals for acts such as Grant Smith & The Power, Pat Hervey, and The Allen Sisters. "Where Does All the Time Go" attracted the attention of Billboard, who featured the single in its March 28, 1968 issue. The following year, the group disbanded; Russell later became a Grammy Award-nominated singer-songwriter, while Richardson became a prominent singer-actress.

References

Black Canadian musical groups
Canadian girl groups
Canadian soul music groups
Musical groups established in 1963
Musical groups disestablished in 1969
Musical groups from Toronto
Vocal quartets